Hengstler is a medium-sized company, which is specialized in the production of industrial counting and control components. As a subsidiary of Fortive, it is represented nationwide on the international electro mechanic market.

History 
The watchmaker Johannes Hengstler started in 1846, in the south of Germany, with the series production of springs.  Over the coming decades, the production was enlarged with relay, rotary encoder, mechanical counter and also printer & cutter.
In 1995, the company has been taken over by Danaher Corporation, an American concern which includes more than 400 companies. Today, Hengstler has various prominent customers like Siemens, IBM, Festo or Bosch.

Products 
Hengstler supplies a complete project management with custom-made applications concerning process control and environmental technology.
It produces, for example, incremental and absolute encoders, relays, mechanical counters, and industrial printers and cutters.

International 
Hengstler has a sister company in Slovakia, and branches in France, Italy, the US and Asia. It owns the Danaher Corporation, with over 400 including companies and locations in over 30 countries and around 60,000 employees. Danaher generates an annual turnover of several billion US dollars.

References

External links 
 
Danaher website

Manufacturing companies of Germany